The 1983 Norwegian Football Cup was the 79th edition of the Norwegian annual knockout football tournament. The Cup was won by Fredrikstad after beating Viking in the cup final. It took a replay to decide the winner. This was Fredrikstad's tenth Norwegian Cup title. They had to wait 22 years for their eleventh title, in 2006.

First round

|colspan="3" style="background-color:#97DEFF"|23 May 1984

|-
|colspan="3" style="background-color:#97DEFF"|29 May 1984

|-
|colspan="3" style="background-color:#97DEFF"|30 May 1984

|-
|colspan="3" style="background-color:#97DEFF"|31 May 1984

|-
|colspan="3" style="background-color:#97DEFF"|Unknown date

|-
|colspan="3" style="background-color:#97DEFF"|Replay: 5 June 1984

|-
|colspan="3" style="background-color:#97DEFF"|Replay: 6 June 1984

|}

Second round

|colspan="3" style="background-color:#97DEFF"|13 June 1984

|-
|colspan="3" style="background-color:#97DEFF"|14 June 1984

|-
|colspan="3" style="background-color:#97DEFF"|Replay: 20 June 1984

|-
|colspan="3" style="background-color:#97DEFF"|Replay: 21 June 1984

|-
|colspan="3" style="background-color:#97DEFF"|Replay: 22 June 1984

|}

Third round

|colspan="3" style="background-color:#97DEFF"|22 June 1984

|-
|colspan="3" style="background-color:#97DEFF"|28 June 1984

|-
|colspan="3" style="background-color:#97DEFF"|Replay: 3 July 1984

|-
|colspan="3" style="background-color:#97DEFF"|Replay: 4 July 1984

|}

Fourth round

|colspan="3" style="background-color:#97DEFF"|2 July 1984

|-
|colspan="3" style="background-color:#97DEFF"|4 July 1984

|-
|colspan="3" style="background-color:#97DEFF"|25 July 1984

|-
|colspan="3" style="background-color:#97DEFF"|1 August 1984

|-
|colspan="3" style="background-color:#97DEFF"|22 August 1984

|}

Quarter-finals

|colspan="3" style="background-color:#97DEFF"|5 September 1984

|-
|colspan="3" style="background-color:#97DEFF"|Replay: 19 September 1984

|}

Semi-finals

|colspan="3" style="background-color:#97DEFF"|23 September 1984

|-
|colspan="3" style="background-color:#97DEFF"|Replay: 28 September 1984

|}

Final

First match

Replay match 

Fredrikstad's winning squad: Jan Erik Olsen, Lars Sørlie, Per Egil Ahlsen, Hans Deunk, Espen Engebretsen, 
Jan Erik Audsen, Terje Jensen, Reidar Lund, Vidar Hansen, 
Jørn Andersen, Atle Kristoffersen, Vidar Kristoffersen, Morten Thomassen, 
Arild Andreassen, Tom Espen Fingarsen, Åge Wiggo Hansen and Henning Johannesen.

Viking's squad: Erik Thorstvedt, Svein Fjælberg, Per Henriksen,
Arild Ravndal, Isak Arne Refvik, Torbjørn Svendsen, Ivar Hauge, 
Tonning Hammer, Nils Ove Hellvik, Gary Goodchild and Kjell Lundahl.

References 
http://www.rsssf.no

Norwegian Football Cup seasons
Norway
Football Cup